The Shire of Exmouth is a local government area in the Gascoyne region of Western Australia, about  north of the state capital, Perth.

History
The Shire of Exmouth was formed on 1 January 1964 by splitting from the Shire of Carnarvon. The original council had five members.

Wards
The shire was not divided into wards and the seven councillors sit at large.

Towns and localities
The towns and localities of the Shire of Exmouth with population and size figures based on the most recent Australian census:

Heritage-listed places

As of 2023, 38 places are heritage-listed in the Shire of Exmouth, of which six are on the State Register of Heritage Places, among them the Vlamingh Head Lighthouse.

References

External links
 

 
Exmouth